Fireflight may refer to

 Fireflight, an American Christian rock band
 Fireflight discography, the discography of the above band
 Fireflight (Transformers), a character in the Transformers franchise

See also 

 Firefly (disambiguation)